Andrejs Mamikins (Andrey Vladimirovich Mamykin; born 11 March 1976) is a Latvian Russian politician, journalist and a Member of the European Parliament.

Early life and career
Mamikins was born in Leningrad then in the Russian SFSR, and moved to Riga, Latvian SSR with his parents shortly after birth.

Prior to his election, Mamikins was a journalist working for several Latvian Russian-language newspapers, radio stations and television channels. He presented programs on Viasat's TV5 Latvia and on REN TV's Baltic Channel. He studied Russian language and literature and is a graduate of the Faculty of Humanities at the University of Latvia. In 2010 he completed a master's degree in philology from the same institution.

Member of the European Parliament
Mamikins was elected to the European Parliament at the 2014 European Parliament election for the Harmony party. Although he was placed 4th on the Harmony list (Boris Tsilevitch was placed 1st), he was preferenced first on the list by Latvian voters and took the party's single seat in the Parliament. He sits with the Progressive Alliance of Socialists and Democrats group.

Mamikins worked on the delegation for relations with Belarus, as well as a substitute member on the delegation for relations with EU-Kazakhstan, EU-Kyrgyzstan and EU-Uzbekistan Parliamentary Cooperation Committees, and for relations with Tajikistan, Turkmenistan and Mongolia.

He has since been a member of the Committee on Foreign Affairs. In this capacity, he served as the parliament's rapporteur on the Association Agreement between the EU and Georgia.

In December 2017, according to the ranking website MEPRanking.eu, Mamikins was ranked as the 4th most effective Latvian MEP (out of 8) and 365th most effective member of the European Parliament (out of 751).

In 2018 Mamikins left the Harmony party after disagreements with Nils Ušakovs and joined the Latvian Russian Union. He was nominated as that party's candidate for Prime Minister in the 2018 national election.

In 2020 Mamikins, alongside his party members Tatjana Ždanoka and Miroslav Mitrofanov, was included in the European Platform for Democratic Elections database of "biased observers" for backing disputed and rigged elections in Russia and occupied Ukraine.

Controversy
In mid-2014 Mamikins filed his declaration of financial interests in the European Parliament in Russian, which was promptly refused on the grounds that Russian is not an official language of the European Union. Mamikins publicized the incident on social media, making waves in Latvian Russian community.

In November 2016 the Baltic Centre for Investigative Journalism Re:Baltica reported that Mamikins and another Latvian MEP Iveta Grigule were circumventing the 2014 ban of hiring close relatives as assistants, with Mamikins employing Grigule's daughter Anete and Grigule employing Mamikins' wife Natalija. All four of them declined to comment.

In December 2016 Mamikins met with President of Syria Bashar al-Assad and parliamentary speaker Hadiey Abbas and visited a Russian airbase at Hyeymim along with five other MEPs and representatives of Russian Federation's Federal Council of the Federal Assembly. The visit was condemned by Minister of Foreign Affairs of Latvia Edgars Rinkēvičs and Security Police head Normunds Mežviets.

References

External links
 European Parliament, MEP profile
 Socialists and Democrats profile

1976 births
Living people
Soviet emigrants to Latvia
Latvian journalists
Latvian Russian Union MEPs
Harmony Centre MEPs
Latvian Russian Union politicians
MEPs for Latvia 2014–2019
University of Latvia alumni